Hector Lincoln Wynter, OJ, (born 7 July 1926 in Camagüey, Cuba; died 31 December 2002 in Mona, Jamaica) was a Jamaican educator, editor, diplomat and politician of the Jamaica Labour Party (JLP).

Early life and education
Hector Wynter was born on July 27, 1926, to actress Lola Maude (Reid) Wynter (Miss Birdie in the popular radio drama Life in Hopeful Village) and her husband, tailor Percival Wynter.

He attended St. Simon's College and Wolmer's Boys' High School, where he was captain of the track team, played cricket, and boxed. He went on to study at Havana University, in Cuba where he attained a Teachers Certificate in 1946. In 1948, he received an Issa Scholarship, and the following year, he won a Rhodes scholarship. At the University of Oxford, England, 1949-1952 he achieved a Bachelor of Arts Modern Language. At the University of London, 1952-1953 he graduated with a Diploma Education. Back at Oxford in 1956, he earned his Master of Arts degree.

Career
After returning to Jamaica, he taught Spanish at Calabar High School, in Kingston. Starting in 1955, he served the University of the West Indies as a lecturer in adult education and as a professor of Spanish and director of the Extra-Mural Studies Department.

After demonstrating his early commitment to young people through service in the educational sector, Wynter went on to apply his commitment and skills to developing the newly independent nation in the political arena. One commentator remarked that Wynter was "a driving force behind the Jamaica Labour Party Government's effort to engage the youths in something meaningful that would... make them good men and women of the future [and] keep them away from, drugs, prison and the street." After Jamaica gained its independence from Britain in 1962, Wynter was a member of the first Jamaican Senate. In 1963, he was appointed as the first Jamaican High Commissioner in Trinidad and Tobago. Wynter was parliamentary secretary in the State Department between 1965 and 1967, then served as Minister of Education from 1967 to 1969 and at the Ministry of Youth from 1969 to 1972. In the Jamaica Labor Party, he exercised the office of Chairman from 1970 to 1972.

Wynter was Permanent Representative of Jamaica to UNESCO and from 1970 to 1976 Member of the Executive Council of UNESCO from 1981 to 1985. From 1974 to 1976, he was chairman of this body. According to the citation read at the ceremony awarding him the Order of Jamaica, while at UNESCO, Wynter had "projected Jamaica's image in international forums 'more than any other single person in the decades of the sixties and seventies.'"

He became Executive Editor at The Gleaner, Jamaica's most influential newspaper, in 1974, then Editor-in-Chief in 1976. He was Editor-in-Chief of during the politically turbulent 1970s and came into confrontation with the ruling pro-socialist People's National Party, especially when Prime Minister Michael Manley declared a state of emergency. In 1985, he was instrumental in the founding of the Bustamante Institute of Public Affairs, "which seeks to promote the ideals of Sir Alexander Bustamante, the country's first Prime Minister."

Positions and appointments
 Teacher of Spanish, Calabar High School — 1945–1949
 Resident Tutor, Department, of Extra-mural Studies, University of W. Indies 1953–1955
 Deputy Registrar, University of W. Indies 1955–1960
 Director Extra-mural Studies, University of W. Indies 1963
 Senator, Parliament of Jamaica 1962–1972
 High Commissioner, Trinidad and Tobago 1963–1964
 Registrar, University of W. Indies 1964–1965
 Parliamentary Secretary to Prime Minister on External Affairs 1965–1967
 Minister of State for Education 1967–1969, for Youth and Development 1969–1972
 Executive Board UNESCO 1970–1976, 1981–1985, 
 Chairman 76, Chairman Finance Committee 1972–1974
 Representative UNESCO Institute Program for Development of Communication since 1986
 Executive; Director Gleaner Company 1979–1988
 Chairman Bustamente Institute of Public and Institute Affairs 1984–1990
 Executive Secretary Caribbean Democratic Union since 1990
 Director Projects Association of Caribbean Universities 1973
 Executive Board Institute Press Institute.
 Chairman New Radio Company of Jamaica since 1989.

Honours
In the 1980s, he was awarded the Order of Jamaica.

Personal life
Hector Wynter was one of four children of Percival Wynter and Lola Maude (Reid) Wynter. His sisters are the Honourable Sylvia Wynter (b. 11 May 1928), OJ and Etta Wynter Rowe; his brother is Basil Wynter.
September 1, 1956, Wynter married English teacher and UNESCO representative Jacqueline (Jackie) Antrobus (b. 1933, Layou, St. Vincent, d. 16 Jun 2006, divorced 1969). They had three children: Astrid Wynter (Senior Operations Advisor at the Inter-American Development Bank (IDB) in the Bahamas), Brian Wynter (Governor of the Bank of Jamaica since 2009), and Colin Wynter (a barrister-at-law in London, specializing in insurance). Hector Wynter went on to marry Diana Ayee Wynter  (b. 5 May 1946) on December 31, 1969, and they had three children: Sara-Jean Wynter Martin, Mark Wynter, and actor and model Lincoln Wynter (also known as Hector Lincoln).

After a traffic accident on December 27, 2002, Hector Wynter was taken to the Hospital of the University of the West Indies in Mona, where he succumbed to his injuries a few days later.

References

1926 births
2002 deaths
University of the West Indies academics
Members of the Order of Jamaica
Jamaica Labour Party politicians
Alumni of the University of London
Jamaican Rhodes Scholars
Members of the Senate of Jamaica
Jamaican newspaper editors
Jamaican expatriates in Cuba
Permanent Delegates of Jamaica to UNESCO